Arsène Lupin Returns is a 1938 American mystery film directed by George Fitzmaurice and written by James Kevin McGuinness, Howard Emmett Rogers, and George Harmon Coxe. The film stars Melvyn Douglas, Virginia Bruce, Warren William, John Halliday, Nat Pendleton, and Monty Woolley. The film was released on February 25, 1938 by Metro-Goldwyn-Mayer.

Plot
After being asked to resign from the FBI, a publicity-hungry detective goes into private business. His first job is to protect a very precious jewel belonging to the Grissac family, which is the object of a failed robbery attempt in New York City. When he accompanies the Grissacs back to France, he encounters a friend of the family, Rene Farrand, who he rapidly comes to suspect is the master thief Arsène Lupin, someone believed to have been killed several years before.

Cast
 Melvyn Douglas as Rene Farrand
 Virginia Bruce as Lorraine de Grissac
 Warren William as Steve Emerson
 John Halliday as Count de Grissac
 Nat Pendleton as Joe Doyle
 Monty Woolley as Georges Bouchet
 E. E. Clive as Alf
 George Zucco as Prefect of Police
 Rollo Lloyd as Duval
 Vladimir Sokoloff as Ivan Pavloff
 Ian Wolfe (credited as Ien Wulf) as Le Marchand
 Tully Marshall as Monelle
 Jonathan Hale as F.B.I. Special Agent

References

Bibliography
 Backer, Ron. Mystery Movie Series of 1930s Hollywood. McFarland, 2012.

External links 
 
 
 
 

1938 films
1938 mystery films
American mystery films
Metro-Goldwyn-Mayer films
Films scored by Franz Waxman
Films directed by George Fitzmaurice
American black-and-white films
Films set in Paris
Arsène Lupin films
1930s English-language films
1930s American films